Colonel James Dampier Palmer  MP (6 September 1851 – 18 October 1899), was an English businessman, British Army officer, and a Progressive-Conservative politician.

Early years
Palmer's father was William Palmer of Bury House, Romford, Essex and his mother was Jane Michel Trestrail.  He was educated at Felsted School.

Career
Palmer worked in the banking firm and family business of Messrs. Palmer & Co., in Stratford and became its Chairman. He was also a Director of Hatch, Mansfield & Co., Ltd. of London, S.W. Palmer was a Justice of the peace for Kent and West Ham.  During his political career, he served as a Member of Parliament for Gravesend on 8 July 1892 –  2 July 1898, leaving his seat in Parliament before the end of his second term as he had accepted the Stewardship of the three Chiltern Hundreds. As a result, a by-election was held 13 July 1898. He also served in the Volunteer Forces of the British Army.  He was first commissioned as a supernumerary sub-lieutenant in the 5th Essex Rifle Volunteer Corps on 2 August 1876, and resigned that commission on 5 September 1877. He was later appointed Honorary Colonel of the 3rd Volunteer (Kent) Brigade, Cinque Ports Division, Royal Artillery.

Personal life
He married Isabella Elizabeth Curteis Whelan (b. 20 November 1852) in 1874. Elizabeth's maternal grandfather was James Planché, a British dramatist, antiquary and officer of arms. Palmer and his wife had at least two children.  Their only son was Vivian Trestrail Dampier Palmer, O.B.E. (b. 1876). A daughter was named Maud Isabel Dampier.

In 1891 when as prospective Member of Parliament for Gravesend he presented the Dampier-Palmer Cup which was competed for by local football clubs, until 2009, to raise money for local charities.

Palmer had multiple residences including 7 Park Place, St. James, S.W.; 31 Bruswick Terrace, Brighton; and Heronden Hall, Tenterden, Kent. He belonged to several clubs such as the Carlton Club, Junior Carlton Club, Bath Club, and Coaching Club.

He died at age 48 at Brighton on 16 October 1899. A brass plate commemorating Palmer's donations to the parish, including chancel screen, choir seats, choir screens, the lectern, and the pulpit, is located at the Parish Church of St. Mildred in Tenterden.

References

External links 

1851 births
1899 deaths
People educated at Felsted School
Conservative Party (UK) MPs for English constituencies
UK MPs 1892–1895
UK MPs 1895–1900
Volunteer Force officers